The 40th People's Choice Awards, honoring the best in popular culture for 2013, was held January 8, 2014, at the Nokia Theatre in Los Angeles, California, and was broadcast live on CBS at 9:00 pm EST. The ceremony was hosted by Beth Behrs and Kat Dennings. Nominations were announced on November 5, 2013.

Sandra Bullock dominated the 40th People's Choice Awards by winning the most awards and four of her five nominations, including Favorite Movie Actress.

Performances
OneRepublic – Counting Stars
Sara Bareilles – Brave
Brad Paisley – The Mona Lisa

Presenters

Jessica Alba
Stana Katic
Sandra Bullock
Zac Efron
Britney Spears
Christina Aguilera
Justin Timberlake
Anna Faris
Marg Helgenberger
Roma Downey
Kaley Cuoco
Emily Deschanel
Michael Weatherly
Josh Holloway
Ellen DeGeneres
LL Cool J
Chris O'Donnell
Melissa McCarthy
Drew Barrymore
Nina Dobrev
Robert Downey Jr.
Sarah Michelle Gellar
Sean Hayes

Allison Janney
Michael B. Jordan
Queen Latifah
Julianna Margulies
Shemar Moore
Norman Reedus
Ian Somerhalder
Miles Teller
Allison Williams
Malin Akerman
Stephen Amell
Wayne Brady
Stephen Colbert
Chris Colfer
Naya Rivera
Lucy Hale
Heidi Klum
Ross Mathews
Joseph Morgan
Meghan Ory
Ian Ziering
Matt LeBlanc

Winners and nominees
Winners are listed first in bold.

Movies

Television

Music

References

People's Choice Awards
2013 awards in the United States
2014 in American television
2014 in Los Angeles
January 2014 events in the United States